John Oliver Udal (1926–2022) was an officer in the Irish Guards who served in Mandatory Palestine.  He was then a district commissioner in Anglo-Egyptian Sudan.  He was responsible for the Shilluk Kingdom and was privileged to witness the coronation ceremony for Reth Kur Wad Fafiti in Fashoda in 1952.

He was the grandson of John Symonds Udal.  He was educated at Winchester College and New College, Oxford.

He was a councillor for Kensington South on the London County Council from 1961 to 1965.  He started a career as a shipbroker in 1966.  He was then an alderman on the Greater London Council from 1967 to 1973.

He died on 12 September 2022, aged 96.

Works
 The Nile in Darkness: Conquest and Exploration 1504-1862 (1998)
 The Nile in Darkness, a Flawed Unity, 1863-1899 (2005)
 Munich on the Nile – The Road to Sudanese Independence (2016)

References

1926 births
2022 deaths
Alumni of New College, Oxford
Irish Guards officers
People educated at Winchester College
Sudan Political Service officers